This article serves as an index – as complete as possible – of all the honorific orders or similar decorations awarded by France, classified by Monarchies chapter and Republics chapter, and, under each chapter, recipients' countries and the detailed list of recipients.

Awards

MONARCHIES 
European monarchies

British Royal Family 

 The Queen :  1948 -  Grand Cross of the National Order of the Legion of Honour
 The Prince of Wales : 1982 – - Grand Cross of the National Order of the Legion of Honour

Norwegian Royal Family 
See also decorations pages (mark °) : Harald, Sonja, Haakon, Mette-Marit, Mârtha Louise, Astrid & Ragnhild

 Harald V of Norway:  Grand Cross of the Légion d'honneur°
 Queen Sonja of Norway: Grand Cross of the Ordre national du Mérite°
 Princess Astrid of Norway: Grand Cross of the Ordre national du Mérite°

Swedish Royal Family   

 Carl XVI Gustaf of Sweden : Grand Cross of the Legion of Honour
 Queen Silvia of Sweden : Grand Cross of the Legion of Honour 
 Victoria, Crown Princess of Sweden : Grand Cross of the National Order of Merit

Danish Royal Family 

 Margrethe II of Denmark: Grand Cross of the Legion of Honour

Dutch Royal Family 

 King Willem-Alexander of the Netherlands : Grand Cross of the National Order of Merit
 Princess Beatrix of the Netherlands : Grand Cross of the Legion of Honour (1991)
 Princess Margriet of the Netherlands : Grand Cross of the National Order of Merit
 Pieter van Vollenhoven :  Grand Cross of the National Order of Merit

Spanish Royal Family 

 Juan Carlos I of Spain :
 Grand Cross of the Legion of Honour
 Grand Cross of the National Order of Merit
 Queen Sofía of Spain : Grand Cross of the Legion of Honour
 Felipe, Prince of Asturias : Grand Cross of the Legion of Honour
 Letizia, Princess of Asturias : Grand-Cross of the National Order of Merit

Monegasque Princely Family 

 Albert II, Prince of Monaco :
 Grand Cross of the Legion of Honour (2006)
 Grand Cross of the Ordre National du Mérite (25 July 1997) 
 Commander of the Ordre des Palmes Académiques (19 June 2009)

Asian monarchies

Jordanian Royal Family 

 Prince Ali Bin Al-Hussein, son of Queen Alia of Jordan, half-brother of Abdullah II of Jordan : Knight of the National Order of the Legion of Honour 
 Princess Rym, Prince Ali 's wife : Knight of the National Order of the Legion of Honour 
 Prince Muhammad bin Talal, eldest younger brother of King Hussein I of Jordan : Grand Cross of the Order of National Merit 
 Prince Ghazi bin Muhammad, younger son of Muhammad bin Talal: 
 Grand Cross of the Order of National Merit (16.11.1999)
 Officer (10.3.1997), Commander (20.11.1997), Grand Officer (7.1.2000) of the National Order of the Legion of Honour

Thai Royal Family 

 Princess Sirindhorn of Thailand : Commander of Ordre des Palmes Academiques, 1989

Bruneian Royal Family 

 Hassanal Bolkiah : Grand Croix of the National Order of the Legion of Honour (12.2.1996)

Japanese Imperial Family 

 Emperor Akihito : Grand Cross of the Légion d'honneur

References 

 
France